Johnie Berntsson (born 11 August 1972) is a Swedish sailor competing in match racing.

Berntsson finished 3rd overall on the 2011 World Match Racing Tour and was awarded the title Swedish Sailor of the Year.

References

Swedish male sailors (sport)
Royal Gothenburg Yacht Club sailors
1972 births
Living people
Place of birth missing (living people)